The 6 February 1934 crisis (also known as the Veterans' Riot) was an anti-parliamentarist street demonstration in Paris organized by multiple far-rightist leagues that culminated in a riot on the Place de la Concorde, near the building used for the French National Assembly. The police shot and killed 15 demonstrators. It was one of the major political crises during the Third Republic (1870–1940). Leftist Frenchmen claimed it was an attempt to organize a fascist coup d'état. According to historian Joel Colton, "The consensus among scholars is that there was no concerted or unified design to seize power and that the leagues lacked the coherence, unity, or leadership to accomplish such an end."

As a result of the actions of that day, several anti-fascist organisations were created, such as the Comité de vigilance des intellectuels antifascistes, in an attempt to thwart fascism in France. After World War II, several historians, among them Serge Berstein, argued that while some leagues had indisputably desired a coup, François de La Rocque had in fact moderated toward a respect for constitutional order. However, the fascist actions on 6 February were arguably an uncoordinated but violent attempt to overthrow the Cartel des gauches government elected in 1932.

Radical-Socialist politician Édouard Daladier, who was president of the Council of Ministers, replaced Camille Chautemps on 27 January 1934 because of accusations of corruption (including the Stavisky Affair).  Daladier, who had been popular, was nonetheless forced to resign on 7 February. He was replaced by the conservative Radical Gaston Doumergue as head of the government; this was the first time during the Third Republic that a government was ended because of street demonstrations.

The 1930s crisis and the Stavisky affair

France was affected in 1931, somewhat later than other Western countries, by the 1929 Great Depression, which had been initiated by the Wall Street Crash of 1929 ("Black Tuesday"). The economic and social crisis particularly affected the middle classes who tended traditionally to endorse the Republic (in particular of the Radical-Socialist Party). Parliamentary instability ensued, with five governments between May 1932 and January 1934, which encouraged anti-parliamentarists.

The latter took advantage also of a succession of political and financial scandals, such as the Marthe Hanau Affair (she had used her political supporters to attract, with her newspaper La Gazette du Franc, the savings of the petite bourgeoisie); the Oustric Affair (the criminal bankruptcy of banker Albert Oustric provoked the end of André Tardieu's government in 1930, because of the involvement of the Minister of Justice); and, finally, the immediate cause of the 6 February 1934 demonstrations, the Stavisky Affair.

This new scandal, which involved Bayonne's bank Crédit municipal, was publicized beginning December 1933. The embezzler Alexandre Stavisky, known as le beau Sasha ("Handsome Sasha") was associated with several Radical deputies, including a minister of Camille Chautemps's government. The press later revealed that Stavisky had benefited from a 19-month postponement of his trial because the public prosecutor was Chautemps' brother-in-law. On 8 January 1934, Alexandre Stavisky was found dead. According to the police report, he had committed suicide, a conclusion that provoked general disbelief. According to rightists, Chautemps had had him assassinated to keep him from revealing any secrets. The press then started a political campaign against alleged governmental corruption, while far rightists demonstrated. At the end of the month, after the revelation of yet another scandal, Chautemps resigned. Édouard Daladier, another politician of the Radical-Socialist Party, succeeded him on 27 January 1934.

Since 9 January, thirteen demonstrations had already occurred in Paris. While the parliamentary right was trying to use the affair to replace the left-wing majority elected during the 1932 elections, the far rightists took advantage of its traditional themes: antisemitism, xenophobia (Stavisky was a naturalized Ukrainian Jew), hostility toward Freemasonry (Camille Chautemps was a Masonic dignitary), and anti-parliamentarism.  As historian Serge Bernstein emphasized, the Stavisky Affair was exceptional neither in its seriousness nor in the personalities put on trial, but in the rightists' determination to use the opportunity to make a leftist government resign, helped by the fact that the Radical-Socialists did not have an absolute majority in the National Assembly and thus the government was weak and an alternative coalition might be formed by the parties to the right.

However, it was the dismissal of the police prefect Jean Chiappe that ultimately provoked the massive demonstrations of 6 February. Chiappe, a fervent anticommunist, was accused of double standards, including leniency towards the street agitation of the far-right (demonstrations, riots, attacks against the few leftist students in the Quartier Latin by the monarchist Camelots du Roi, the youth organization of the Action Française, etc.). According to the leftists, Chiappe's dismissal was due to his involvement with the Stavisky Affair while the rightists denounced the result of negotiations with the Radical-Socialists: the departure of Chiappe would have been exchanged for endorsement of Daladier's new government.

The night of 6 February 1934

Forces present
Rightist anti-parliamentary leagues had been the main activists during the January 1934 demonstrations. Although these leagues were not a new phenomenon (the old Ligue des Patriotes ("Patriot League") had been initiated by Paul Déroulède in 1882), they played an important role after World War I, in particular when leftists were in power, as they had been since the 1932 legislative elections. The leagues differed in their goals, but were united by their opposition to the ruling Radical-Socialist party.

Action Française. Among the most important rightist leagues present on 6 February, the oldest one was the royalist Ligue d'Action Française. Founded in 1905 by Charles Maurras, it was composed of 60,000 members whose stated goal was to abolish the Third Republic, in order to restore the Bourbon monarchy and thus revert to the status quo of before the 1848 Revolution. Action Française endorsed a royal restoration, but this specific goal served as a rallying theme for a more general series of ideas, appealing to political Catholics, nationalists and anti-democrats opposed to the secular, internationalist and parliamentary type of republicanism associated with the Radical-Socialists and the Radicals. Although no longer a major mobilised political force, it had great prestige among the rest of the French right and had succeeded in spreading its ideas to other conservatives. The actual street agitation associated with Action Française was performed largely by its youth wing, the Camelots du Roi, which had much influence with students, and was prone to street brawls with leftists students in the Latin Quarter.
The Jeunesses Patriotes ("Patriot Youth") had been initiated by Pierre Taittinger, deputy of Paris, in 1924. With 90,000 members, including 1,500 "elites", it claimed the legacy of the Ligue des Patriotes. Their main point of difference from Action Française was that they did not seek to abolish the republic and restore the monarchy; their chief goal was to end the forty year dominance of Radical-Socialists and Radicals in government, giving the republic a more Catholic and authoritarian direction. The Jeunesses Patriotes had close links with mainstream right-wing politicians, notably the main party of the religious right, the Fédération Républicaine, and boasted several of the capital's municipal councillors in their ranks.
Solidarité Française ("French Solidarity"), founded in 1933 by the Bonapartist deputy and perfume magnate François Coty, had no precise political objectives and few members.
Francisme and others. Marcel Bucard's Francisme had adopted all the elements of the fascist ideology, while the Fédération des contribuables ("Taxpayers federation") shared its political objectives with the other leagues.
The Croix-de-Feu (Cross of Fire). The Croix-de-Feu had been created in 1926 as a World War I veterans association. The most important league by membership numbers, it had extended its recruitment in 1931 to other categories of the population, as directed by Colonel François de la Rocque. Like the other leagues, they also had "combat" and "self-defense" groups, known as "dispos". Although many on leftists accused it of having become fascist, especially after the crisis, historians now categorise it as a populist social-Catholic protest society, and that La Rocque's reluctance to order his protesters to join with the other leagues in attacking parliament directly was a major reason for the riots' failure to escalate into a regime change.
Veterans' associations. The veterans' associations which had participated with the demonstrations of January also began demonstrating on 6 February. The most important, the Union nationale des combattants (UNC), directed by a Parisian municipal counsellor whose ideas were similar to the rightists', counted 900,000 members.
Finally, an indication of the complexity of the situation and the general exasperation of the population, also present were elements associated with the French Communist Party (PCF), including its veterans' association, the Association républicaine des anciens combattants (ARAC).

The riots

On the night of 6 February, the leagues, which had gathered in different places in Paris, all converged on Place de la Concorde, located in front of the Bourbon Palace, but on the other side of the river Seine. The police and guards managed to defend the strategic bridge of the Concorde, despite being the target of all sorts of projectiles. Some rioters were armed, and the police fired on the crowd. Disturbances lasted until 2:30 AM. 16 people were killed and 2,000 injured, most of them members of the Action Française.

Far-rightist organisations had the most important role in the riots; most of the UNC veterans avoided the Place de la Concorde, creating some incidents near the Elysée palace, the president's residence. However, Communists belonging to the rival leftist veterans' organization ARAC may have been involved; one public notice afterward condemned the governing centre-left coalition (known as the Cartel des gauches) for having shot unarmed veterans who shouted "Down with the thieves, long live France!".

While on the right side of the Seine (north, on the Place de la Concorde), the policemen's charges contained the rioters with difficulty, the Croix-de-feu had chosen to demonstrate in the south. The Palais Bourbon, the building used by the National Assembly, is much more difficult to defend on this side, but the Croix-de-feu limited themselves to surrounding the building without any major incident before dispersing. Because of this attitude, they earned the pejorative nickname of Froides Queues in the far-rightist press. Contrary to the other leagues which were intent on abolishing the Republic, it thus seemed that Colonel de la Rocque finally decided to respect the legality of the republican (unlike the Action Française) and parliamentary (unlike the Jeunesses Patriotes) regime.

In the National Assembly, the rightists attempted to take advantage of the riots to cause the Cartel des gauches government to resign. The leftists, however, rallied around president of the Council Édouard Daladier. The session was ended after blows were exchanged between left and right-wing deputies.

Consequences of the riots

Daladier's resignation and the formation of a National Union government
During the night, Daladier took the first measures to obtain the re-establishment of public order. He did not exclude the possibility of declaring a state of emergency, although he finally decided against it. However, the next day the judiciary and the police resisted his directives. Moreover, most of his ministers and his party denied him their endorsement. Thus, Daladier finally chose to resign. This was the first time during the Third Republic that a government had to resign because of pressure from street demonstrations.

The crisis was finally resolved with the formation of a new government directed by former president of the Republic (1924–31) Gaston Doumergue, a rightist Radical Republican who was ostensibly the only figure acceptable to both the far-rightist leagues and to the centrist parliamentary parties. Termed a "National Union government", in reality it was a government containing all political traditions but excluding the Socialist and Communist parties. It included the most important politicians of the parliamentary right wing, among them the Liberal André Tardieu, Radical Louis Barthou, and social-Catholic Louis Marin, although also included were several members of the centre-left (the Radical-Socialist and similar smaller parties), plus War Minister Philippe Pétain, who would later command the collaborationist Vichy regime during World War II.

Toward the union of the left wing

After 6 February, leftists were convinced that a fascist putsch had occurred. The importance of the anti-parliamentarist activity of far-rightist leagues was undeniable. Some of them, such as the Francisque, had copied all of their characteristics from the Italian Fascio leagues which had marched on Rome in 1922, thus resulting in the imposition of the fascist regime. Although historian Serge Bernstein has showed that Colonel de la Rocque had probably been convinced of the necessity of respecting constitutional legality, this was not true of all members of his Croix-de-feu society, which also shared, at least superficially, some characteristics of the fascist leagues, in particular their militarism and fascination for parades.

On 9 February 1934, a socialist and communist counter-demonstration occurred while Daladier was being replaced by Doumergue. Nine people were killed during incidents with the police forces. On 12 February the trade union Confédération générale du travail (CGT) (reformist, with some associations with the Socialist Party) and the Confédération générale du travail unitaire (CGTU) (revolutionary, and associated with the communist party) decided to organize a one-day general strike, while the socialist party Section française de l'Internationale ouvrière (SFIO) and the communist party opted for a separate demonstration. However, at the initiative of the popular base of these societies, the demonstrations finally united themselves into one. Thus, this day marked a first tentative union between the socialists and the communists. It had at its core the anti-fascism shared by both Marxist parties; a union had been opposed since the division of the 1920 Tours Congress, but this new rapprochement resulted in the 1936 Popular Front (consisting of radicals and socialists and endorsed without participation in the government by the Communist party). This antifascist union was in acordance with Stalin's directives to the Comintern, which had asked the European communist parties to ally with other leftist parties, including social-democrats and socialists, in order to block the contagion of fascist and anti-communist regimes in Europe.

Furthermore, several anti-fascist organizations were created after the riots, such as the Comité de vigilance des intellectuels antifascistes (Watchfulness Committee of Antifascist Intellectuals, created in March 1934) which included philosopher Alain, ethnologist Paul Rivet and physicist Paul Langevin. The anarchists also participated with many antifascist actions.

The radicalization of the rightists
After the crisis, the parliamentary rightists also began to get closer to the counter-revolutionary far rightists. Several of its main activists would lose all trust in parliamentary institutions. Daniel Halévy, a French historian of Jewish ancestry, publicly declared that since 6 February 1934 he was now a "man of the extreme right". Although he personally abhorred Italian fascism or German national socialism, he later endorsed the Pétain regime of Vichy. The radicalization of the rightists would accelerate after the election of the Popular Front in 1936 and the Spanish Civil War (1936–39).

The American journalist John Gunther wrote in 1940 that the Croix-de-feu "could easily have captured the Chamber of Deputies. But [de la Rocque] held his men back. 'France wasn't ready,' he explained". It was possible, Gunther said, that "like Hitler, he hopes to gain power by legal means". To the far rightists, 6 February represented a failed opportunity to abolish the Republic, which only presented itself again in 1940 after the balance had been changed by the étrange défaite (Marc Bloch) or "divine surprise" (Charles Maurras), that is the 1940 defeat during the Battle of France against Germany. This deception prompted several far-right members to radicalize themselves, endorsing fascism, Nazism, or the wartime Vichy regime.

Despite the claims of the leftists, the 6 February crisis was not a fascist conspiracy. The far-rightist leagues were not united enough and most of them lacked any specific objectives. However, their violent methods, their paramilitary appearances, their cult of leadership, etc., explained why they have often been associated with fascism. Other than these appearances, however, and their will to see the parliamentary regime replaced by an authoritarian regime, historians René Rémond and Serge Bernstein do not consider that they had a real fascist project. Opposing this opinion, other historians, such as Michel Dobry or Zeev Sternhell, considered them as being fully fascist leagues. Brian Jenkins claimed it was pointless to seek a fascist essence in France and preferred to make comparisons which resulted, according to him, in a convergence between Italian fascism and the majority of the French leagues, in particular the Action Française (in other words, Jenkins considers fascism an Italian historic phenomenon, and though a fascist-like philosophy existed in France, it should not be termed "fascist" as that name should be reserved for Benito Mussolini's politics).

See also
Battle of Cable Street
Bonus March
Cartel des gauches
Comité de vigilance des intellectuels antifascistes
Far-right leagues
French Third Republic (1871–1940)
Geneva fusillade of 9 November 1932
Interwar France

References

Further reading
 Beloff, Max. "The Sixth of February." in James Joll, ed. The Decline of the Third Republic (1959)
 Dobry, Michel. "February 1934 and the Discovery of French Society's Allergy to the 'Fascist Revolution." in Brian Jenkins, ed. France in the Era of Fascism: Essays on the French Authoritarian Right (Berghahn. 2005) pp 129–50 
 Hoisington, William A. "Toward the Sixth of February: Taxpayer Protest in France, 1928–1934." Historical Reflections/Réflexions Historiques (1976): 49–67. in JSTOR
 Jankowski, Paul. "The sixth of February 1934: the press against the historians?." Contemporary French Civilization 45.1 (2020): 89-103. DOI: https://doi.org/10.3828/cfc.2020.6
 Jenkins, Brian. "The six fevrier 1934 and the 'Survival' of the French Republic." French History 20.3 (2006): 333–351; historiography
 Jenkins, Brian. "Plots and rumors: Conspiracy theories and the six février 1934." French Historical Studies 34.4 (2011): 649–678.
 Jenkins, Brian, and Chris Millington. France and Fascism: February 1934 and the Dynamics of Political Crisis (Routledge, 2015)
 Kennedy, Sean. Reconciling France Against Democracy: The Croix de Feu and the Parti Social Francais, 1927–1945 (McGill-Queen's Press-MQUP, 2007)
 Millington, Chris. Fighting for France: Violence in Interwar French Politics (Oxford UP, 2018).
 Passmore, Kevin. "The historiography of fascism in France." French Historical Studies 37.3 (2014): 469–499.
Soucy, Robert, French Fascism: The Second Wave, 1933–1939. (Yale University Press, 1995)
 Warner, Geoffrey. "The Stavisky Affair and the Riots of February 6th 1934." History Today (1958): 377–85.

In French
 Blanchard, Emmanuel. "Le 6 février 1934, une crise policière?." Vingtième Siècle. Revue d'histoire 4 (2015): 15–28.
 Rémond, René. "Explications du 6 février." Revue International des Doctrines et des Institution 2 (1959): 218–30.
 (dir.), Le Mythe de l'allergie française au fascisme, éd. Éditions Albin Michel, 2003
 Danielle Tartatowsky, Les Manifestations de rue en France. 1918–1968, Publications de la Sorbonne, 1998
 Michel Winock, La Fièvre hexagonale : Les grandes crises politiques de 1871 à 1968, éd. du Seuil, coll. « Points »-histoire, 1999,

External links
 6 fevrier 1934: Manifestation sanglante a Paris ("6 February 1934: Bloody Demonstration in Paris")

French Third Republic
Far-right politics in France
Riots and civil disorder in France
Police brutality in Europe
1934 in France
1934 in Paris
1934 riots
1934 protests
February 1934 events
Attacks on legislatures